German submarine U-457 was a Type VIIC U-boat of Nazi Germany's Kriegsmarine during World War II.

She carried out three patrols, on which she sank two ships and damaged one more.

She was sunk northeast of the North Cape by a British warship on 16 September 1942.

Design
German Type VIIC submarines were preceded by the shorter Type VIIB submarines. U-457 had a displacement of  when at the surface and  while submerged. She had two shafts and two  propellers.

U-457 was fitted with five  torpedo tubes (four fitted at the bow and one at the stern), fourteen torpedoes, one  SK C/35 naval gun, 220 rounds, and a  C/30 anti-aircraft gun. The boat had a complement of between forty-four and sixty.

Service history
The submarine was laid down on 26 October 1940 in the Deutsche Werke, Kiel as yard number 288, launched on 4 October 1941 and commissioned on 5 November under the command of Korvettenkapitän Karl Brandenburg.

She served with the 6th U-boat Flotilla from 5 November 1941 for training and the 11th flotilla from 1 July 1942 for operations.

First patrol
U-457s first patrol was preceded by two short journeys from Kiel to Trondheim in Norway. The patrol itself commenced with her departure from Trondheim on 28 June 1942.

The ship, from the ill-fated convoy PQ 17, had already been hit by an aerial torpedo in the Barents Sea. A 'coup de grace' torpedo from the British submarine P-614 failed to sink the ship; but one from U-457 succeeded.

The boat then went on to sink the RFA Aldersdale on 7 July 1942; after the merchantman, also a member of PQ 17, had been bombed. U-457 came across the abandoned tanker and after firing 75 rounds from her deck gun, finished the wreck off with a single torpedo.

Second patrol
Her second foray was relatively uneventful – starting in Narvik on 8 August 1942 and finishing in Trondheim on 7 September.

Third patrol and loss
The submarine damaged the Atheltemplar of the Convoy PQ 18 on 14 September 1942 south of Spitsbergen (Svalbard). U-457 was sunk on the 16th by depth charges from the British destroyer .

Forty-five men died in U-457; there were no survivors.

Wolfpacks
U-457 took part in two wolfpacks, namely:
 Eisteufel (30 June – 12 July 1942)
 Trägertod (12 – 16 September 1942)

Summary of raiding history

References

Notes

Citations

Bibliography

External links

German Type VIIC submarines
U-boats commissioned in 1941
U-boats sunk in 1942
U-boats sunk by depth charges
U-boats sunk by British warships
1941 ships
Ships built in Kiel
Ships lost with all hands
World War II submarines of Germany
World War II shipwrecks in the Arctic Ocean
Maritime incidents in September 1942